647th Regional Support Group is a United States Army Reserve unit based in Wichita, Kansas.

References

Support groups of the United States Army